Pape Nature Reserve is a Nature Reserve in Latvia about 15 km south of Liepaja. It stretches over 5700 ha and consists mainly of bogs, carr forests and dunes around Lake Pape. It is an important site for migrating birds. Every autumn about 50,000 birds rest in the reserve. Large grazers, like heck cattle, konik horses and European bison have been introduced to the reserve with support of the WWF. There is a visitor centre in the reserve.

Fauna 
Heck cattle and horses were introduced in 1999, European bison were introduced a few years later. In 2007 there were more than 80 heck cattle and more than 100 horses in the reserve. European bison were still below 20 and slowly increasing. Before the introduction of the three large herbivore species, the reserve was already home to moose, red deer, roe deer, wolf and lynx. So the reserve harbours now an almost complete holocene mammal fauna.

References 
 Volker Hagemann: Lettland entdecken. Trescher Verlag; Auflage: 1. A. (28. Juli 2006), S. 274–275, 
 E. Marris (2009): Conservation biology: Reflecting the past. Nature 462, 30–32

Nature parks in Latvia